José Javier Belman Calvo (born 4 October 1998) is a Spanish footballer who plays as a goalkeeper for CD Leganés.

Club career
Born in Alicante, Valencian Community, Belman joined Real Madrid's La Fábrica in 2012, from Getafe CF. Ahead of the 2017–18 season, he was promoted to the reserves in Segunda División B, and made his senior debut on 27 August 2017 by starting in a 3–0 away win against Coruxo FC.

A regular starter in his first campaign, Belman subsequently lost his starting spot to Luca Zidane in his second, later regaining the first-choice after Luca departed. On 16 July 2019, he renewed his contract until 2021, but suffered a knee injury the following February which ruled him out of the remainder of the season.

On 25 September 2020, Belman agreed to a one-year contract with Segunda División side CF Fuenlabrada, after terminating his contract with Real Madrid. He made his first team debut on 16 December, starting in a 1–0 away success over CD Atlético Baleares, for the season's Copa del Rey.

Belman made his professional debut on 19 December 2020, playing the full 90 minutes of a 3–2 away win against RCD Mallorca. After becoming a first-choice ahead of Pol Freixanet and Dragan Rosić, he was demoted to third-choice behind new signings Diego Altube and Miguel Morro for the 2021–22 season, after refusing to renew his contract.

Belman only made another appearance for Fuenla in March 2022, ten months after the last one, after the arrival of new manager José Ramón Sandoval. On 11 November, he agreed to a contract with CD Leganés also in the second level until the end of the season.

Personal life
Belman's father, José, was also a footballer and a goalkeeper. He notably represented Real Zaragoza and Portugal's C.D. Nacional.

References

External links
Real Madrid profile

1998 births
Living people
Footballers from Alicante
Spanish footballers
Association football goalkeepers
Segunda División players
Segunda División B players
Real Madrid Castilla footballers
CF Fuenlabrada footballers
CD Leganés players